Fido (c. 1851 – 1865) was a yellow mixed-breed dog owned by Abraham Lincoln and kept by the family for a number of years prior to Lincoln's presidency, and became a presidential pet during Lincoln's presidency, although he remained in Springfield, Illinois.

Early life
Fido was a favorite of Lincoln and his younger sons, Willie and Tad.  He was known to wait for Lincoln outside the barber shop and would sometimes carry a parcel in his mouth when going home with his master.

Lincoln's election

Close to Lincoln, and friendly by nature, Fido was frightened by loud noises and crowds.  After Lincoln was elected, Fido cowered from the crowds who greeted the president-elect, the fireworks, and the increased attention surrounding his master.  Knowing the bustle of Washington, the number of people who would be going through the White House, and the social scene surrounding it, Lincoln and his wife, Mary, decided to leave Fido in Springfield, where the family had lived.

Later life
Fido was left in the care of family friend John E. Roll.  Lincoln gave Roll an old sofa that was a favorite of Fido's, and left instructions that Fido be allowed to have the run of the house, not to be scolded for tracking mud, and to be allowed to wander around the family dinner table and be fed scraps.

Fido remained with the Rolls for the rest of his life. Upon Lincoln's assassination, Roll brought Fido to Lincoln's funeral.

Death
John L. Roll, son of John E., reported to Illinois' State Journal, that Fido had been killed: "Charlie Plank, a half-drunken man, was one day whittling a pine stick when Fido came bounding along and, as usual, sprang forward with his fore feet raised. In drunken rage, the man thrust his knife into the animal, and poor Fido ran away, not to be found for a month after, when his lifeless body was discovered under an old church."

See also
 List of individual dogs

References

Further reading

 

1865 animal deaths
Abraham Lincoln
United States presidential dogs